1000 Sherbrooke West (formerly known as Centre Mont-Royal and Place Internationale de l'Aviation) is a 28-storey,  skyscraper at 1000 Sherbrooke Street West next to Tour Scotia and opposite McTavish Street in downtown Montreal, Quebec, Canada. The tower was designed by Rosen Caruso Vecsei Architects in the Brutalist architectural style, with a concrete and glass facade. Construction was completed in 1974 and once housed the headquarters of ICAO. In 1987, the ICAO offices were the site of the signing of the Montreal Protocol, an international treaty to protect the ozone layer - an agreement considered the most effective international agreement on the environment to date. The Centre Mont-Royal conference center is located on site.

See also
 List of tallest buildings in Montreal

References

External links
 1000 Sherbrooke West
 Centre Mont-Royal Conference and Special Event Center

Brutalist architecture in Canada
Downtown Montreal
Office buildings completed in 1974
Skyscrapers in Montreal
Skyscraper office buildings in Canada